Supriyadi, older spelling Soeprijadi  full name Fransiskus Xaverius  Soeprijadi (born 13 April 1923 – disappeared 14 February 1945, declared dead 9 August 1975), was an Indonesian national hero who rebelled against the occupying Japanese in 1945.

Early life

Supriyadi was born in Trenggalek on 13 April 1923. He attended junior high school, then a training school for civil service in Magelang. However, the Japanese invaded Indonesia before he graduated. He then switched to high school and underwent youth training (Seimendoyo) in Tangerang, West Java.

Involvement with PETA
In October 1943, the Japanese established a militia, PETA to assist Japanese forces against the Allies. Supriyadi joined PETA, and after training was posted to Blitar. He was tasked with overseeing the work of the Romusha forced laborers. The plight of these workers inspired him to rebel against the Japanese. When Supriyadi joined PETA, he was given the rank of shodancho or platoon commander.

The Blitar rebellion

When nationalist leader Sukarno visited his parents in Blitar, PETA officers told him that they had begun to plan a rebellion and asked for Sukarno's opinion. He told them to consider the consequences, but Supriyadi, leader of the rebels, was convinced the uprising would succeed.

In the early hours of 14 February 1945, rebels attacked Japanese troops, causing heavy casualties. However, the Japanese defeated the rebellion and put the ringleaders on trial. Six (or eight) people were sentenced to death and the rest were given jail sentences ranging from three years to life. However, Supriyadi reportedly was not executed. Some said Supriyadi escaped and hid from the Japanese.  He was not seen again after the failure of the rebellion.

Disappearance
On 19 August 1945, in a government decree issued by the newly independent Indonesia, Supriyadi was named Minister for Public Security in the Presidential Cabinet. However, he failed to appear, and was replaced on 20 October by acting minister Muhammad Soeljoadikusuma. To this day his fate remains unknown.

Numerous sightings before his disappearance had been reported. Ronomejo a kamituwo of Ngliman village in Nganjuk reportedly accompanied Supriyadi to his hiding place in a cave near Sedudo waterfall. However, when Supriyadi's father, Damardi visited the place he already left. According to M. Nakajima, director of Taisei International Corporation, Supriyadi and his two companions stayed for a day in his place in Salatiga around February and March 1945, but then left before Kenpeitai from Semarang arrived.

If he was alive during his appointment and took the office, he would have been aged 22 and became the youngest ever minister in the nation's history. He was officially bestowed the title of National Hero on 9 August 1975, thus legally declaring him dead as the title is only given posthumously.

See also
List of people who disappeared

References

Bibliography
 
 
 
 
 
 

1923 births
1940s missing person cases
1975 deaths
Blitar
Defense ministers of Indonesia
Indonesian collaborators with Imperial Japan
Javanese people
Members of Pembela Tanah Air
Missing people
Missing person cases in Indonesia
National Heroes of Indonesia
People declared dead in absentia